M'Bahiakro Department is a department of Iffou Region in Lacs District, Ivory Coast. In 2021, its population was 78,369 and its seat is the settlement of M'Bahiakro. The sub-prefectures of the department are Bonguéra, Kondossou, and M'Bahiakro.

History

M'Bahiakro Department was created in 1985 as a first-level subdivision via a split-off from Bouaké Department.

In 1997, regions were introduced as new first-level subdivisions of Ivory Coast; as a result, all departments were converted into second-level subdivisions. M'Bahiakro Department was included in N'Zi-Comoé Region.

In 2005, the M'Bahiakro Department was divided in order to create Prikro Department.

In 2011, districts were introduced as new first-level subdivisions of Ivory Coast. At the same time, regions were reorganised and became second-level subdivisions and all departments were converted into third-level subdivisions. At this time, M'Bahiakro Department became part of Iffou Region in Lacs District. Districts were suppressed in 2014.

Notes

Departments of Iffou
1988 establishments in Ivory Coast
States and territories established in 1988